Laure Ferrari (* 6 October 1979, Épinal, France) has been a close associate of former UKIP leader Nigel Farage, and has been working for several right-wing to far-right political organizations and parties, including the French nationalist party (Debout la France). Ferrari was head of the Institute for Direct Democracy in Europe (IDDE), a Eurosceptic think tank, which was accused in 2017 of having illegally diverted public money to the benefits of UKIP. Ferrari was also founding member of "The Mouvement," together with Mischaël Modrikamen and his wife Yasmine Dehaene-Modrikamen, which in 2018 was joined and promoted by Steve Bannon.

Life 
Laure Ferrari made acquaintance with then leader of UKIP Nigel Farage 2007 in Strasbourg, while working as a waitress, which led her to start a political career. First Farage gave her a job as a parliamentary assistant in charge of environmental issues. Subsequently, she was made director of public relations for the British delegation of the Europe of Freedom and Democracy (EFD) parliamentary group (2009–2014), which later became the Europe of Freedom and Direct Democracy (EFDD) group. The EFD/EFDD was at the time co-chaired by Nigel Farage and Francesco Speroni. In this context she met Nicolas Dupont-Aignan, leader of the far-right Eurosceptic French party "France Arise" (Debout la France), itself a member of the Alliance for Direct Democracy (ADDE), founded by Ukip. For Debout La France she first worked as a departmental secretary in Bas-Rhin and then as a European affairs delegate in party's national office.

She did not run for a second term, but instead focused on her new role as head of the Institute for Direct Democracy in Europe (IDDE), a Eurosceptic think tank, which was accused in 2017 of having illegally diverted public money to the benefits of UKIP. UKIP was under investigation for having received over £400,000 in donations from the think tank prior to the UK General Election and the Brexit referendum.

In January 2017, she was founding member of "The Mouvement / Le Mouvement" together with Mischaël Modrikamen and his wife Yasmine Dehaene-Modrikamen. Although Modrikamen had envisioned the Movement to become and alliance of populist proponents in Europe and abroad, the project did not catch attention until July 2018 when Steve Bannon declared to work on a European alliance of far-right forces.

References 

21st-century French politicians
21st-century French women politicians
Debout la France politicians
Right-wing populism in France
UK Independence Party
Conservatism in the United Kingdom
Living people
1979 births